Anabrus cerciata, known generally as the big-tooth anabru or big-tooth Mormon cricket, is a species of shield-backed katydid in the family Tettigoniidae.  It is found in North America.

References

 Capinera J.L, Scott R.D., Walker T.J. (2004). Field Guide to Grasshoppers, Katydids, and Crickets of the United States. Cornell University Press.
 Otte, Daniel (1997). "Tettigonioidea". Orthoptera Species File 7, 373.

Further reading

 

Tettigoniinae
Insects described in 1907